Anupallavi may refer to:
 Anupallavi (music), a term in Carnatic music
 Anupallavi (TV series), an Indian Tamil-language soap opera
 Anupallavi (film) a 1979 Indian Malayalam film